Mount Maines, also known as Stornuten, is a mountain, standing roughly  SE of Stor Hånakken Mountain and  W of Mount Elkins in the Napier Mountains, Enderby Land.

Discovery and naming
Mount Maines was mapped by Norwegian cartographers from air photos taken by the Lars Christensen Expedition, 1936–37, and named Stornuten (the big peak). Rephotographed by ANARE in 1956 and renamed by ANCA for R.L. Maines, cook at Wilkes Station in 1961.

See also
 List of mountains of Enderby Land

References

External links
 United States Geological Survey, Geographic Names Information System (GNIS)
 Scientific Committee on Antarctic Research (SCAR)
 Composite Gazetteer of Antarctica

Maines